1-Methyltryptophan is a chemical compound that is an inhibitor of the tryptophan catabolic enzyme indoleamine 2,3-dioxygenase (IDO or INDO ). It is a chiral compound that can exist as both - and -enantiomers.

The -isomer (-1MT) inhibits IDO weakly but also serves as an enzyme substrate.

The -isomer (-1MT) does not inhibit IDO at all, but it can inhibit the IDO-related enzyme IDO2 and restore mTOR signaling in cells starved of tryptophan due to IDO activity. -1MT is also known as indoximod and is currently in clinical trials for cancer treatment, such as for advanced melanoma.

A U.S. patent covering salt and prodrug formulations of indoximod was issued to NewLink Genetics on August 15, 2017 providing exclusivity until at least 2036.

References 

Oxidoreductase inhibitors
Tryptamines
Amino acids